David Alan Beaumont (born 10 December 1963 in Dunfermline) is a Scottish retired footballer who played for Dundee United, Luton Town and Hibernian.

As a youth, Beaumont won the Under-18 European Championship with Scotland in 1982 and reached the quarter-finals of the subsequent Under-20 World Championship in 1983. A versatile defensive midfielder, Beaumont made the breakthrough into the Dundee United first team during the 1983–84 season, but found it hard to get a regular spot in a defence with a back four of Malpas, Gough, Hegarty and Narey. He was used as cover for all four, and appeared as a defensive midfielder occasionally over the next couple of seasons.

Beaumont spent nearly half of the 1986–87 season in the starting eleven, his best run in the first team, making 40 appearances, and played in six matches of United's UEFA Cup run that season, including an appearance as substitute for Paul Sturrock in the first leg of the final. Beaumont left United in January 1989 for Luton Town, for whom he appeared in the 1989 Football League Cup Final.

He returned to Scotland with Hibernian in October 1991. Weeks later, he was an unused substitute as they beat Dunfermline Athletic in the 1991 Scottish League Cup Final. Injuries hampered him after this, however, and he was forced to quit the senior game in 1994. Beaumont became a police officer in Fife, playing for the Scottish Police team.

Honours
Dundee United
 UEFA Cup: Runner-up 1986–87

Luton Town
EFL Cup: Runner-up 1988–89

Hibernian
Scottish League Cup: 1991–92

Scotland
 UEFA U18 European Championship: 1982

References

Sources

External links 
 
 

1963 births
Officers in Scottish police forces
Living people
Footballers from Dunfermline
Association football defenders
Scottish footballers
Dundee United F.C. players
Luton Town F.C. players
Hibernian F.C. players
Scottish police officers
English Football League players
Scottish Football League players
Scotland youth international footballers
Scotland under-21 international footballers